Avon Road station (formerly Bywood) is a  SEPTA Media-Sharon Hill Trolley Lines station in Upper Darby, Pennsylvania, United States. It is officially located at Garrett Road & Avon Road, but Bywood Avenue is also included as it parallels the north side of the line. The station serves both Routes 101 and 102, and only local service is provided on both lines. The station contains two platforms with plexiglass bus-type shelters on both sides of the tracks, both of which are at the far end of each platform. A former P&W-era shelter exists across the tracks from the westbound platform, but it is completely closed and boarded up. This was formerly the inbound platform before the newer inbound platform was moved to the far side after the Avon Road grade crossing.

Trolleys arriving at this station travel between 69th Street Terminal further east in Upper Darby and either Orange Street in Media, Pennsylvania for the Route 101 line, or Sharon Hill, Pennsylvania for the Route 102 line. Both lines run parallel to Garrett Road and Bywood Avenue, however the run along Garrett Road is interrupted by a curve between Sherbrook Boulevard and Avon Road.

Station layout

References

External links

 Station from Google Maps Street View

SEPTA Media–Sharon Hill Line stations